The California Building, located at 1000 Cowan Dr., Idlewild Park, in Reno, Nevada, is a historic building that was built by the state of California for the Transcontinental Highway Exposition of 1927.

Description and history 
It hosted exhibits of California cities and counties. After the exposition, it served as a meeting hall for the Darrel Dunkle Post No.l American
Legion, until 1938, when ownership was returned to the city of Reno. The building was listed on the National Register of Historic Places in 1992.

The building plus related tent annex and exhibits cost $100,000 and was built over a two-year period concluding in 1927.

References 

National Register of Historic Places in Reno, Nevada
Mission Revival architecture in Nevada
Buildings and structures completed in 1927
American Legion buildings
Buildings and structures in Reno, Nevada
Buildings and structures on the National Register of Historic Places in Nevada